Zhu (also 予, 宁, 佇, or 宇) was the seventh king of the semi-legendary Xia dynasty. He took the throne in the year of ji si (己巳) and lived in Yuan (now Jiyuan).

Biography
His father was king Shao Kang and his mother was a daughter of the Chief of Northern Tribe.

In the fifth year of his regime he moved his capital from Yuan to Laoqiu (now Kaifeng); in the eighth year he hunted in the East China Sea and invaded Sanshou; in the thirteenth year his Shang vassal Ming died at He. He was also the inventor of armor in Chinese history.

He died in the seventeenth year of his reign. His successor was his son Huai.

According to Sima Zhen, his named is read "Zhù".

Chronology
Zhu is traditionally held to have succeeded his father Shao Kang and been succeeded by his son Huai. Aside from this, all reign periods and lengths are speculative and unverifiable.

References

Citations

Sources
Early
 
  
 
  

Modern
 
  
 

Xia dynasty kings